Terry M. Considine (born 1947) is the founder of Aimco, the chairman and chief executive officer of Apartment Income REIT, and a former Republican politician.

Biography

Early life and education
Considine was born in San Diego as the 4th of 11 children and was raised on a cattle ranch in Southern California. At age 13, he left California to attend the Groton School in Groton, Massachusetts; he graduated in 1965.

In 1969, Considine graduated from Harvard University with a Bachelor of Arts degree; in 1971 he received a Juris Doctor from Harvard. He initially received a student deferment from the Vietnam War and was later disqualified for service because of a bad back.

Career
In 1975, he founded The Considine Companies, a property-management firm that specialized in troubled real estate. In 1981, he moved to Colorado. In 1981, he acquired the El Cortez Hotel for $6 million in partnership with Bass Brothers Realty Corporation. The hotel was sold in 1987. In 1987, he acquired 75% of McDermott, Stein and Ira Marketing Management (MSI), the largest fee-operated apartment management company in Denver.

In 1994, along with associates Steve Ira, Peter Kompaniez, and Robert Lacey, he formed Aimco, which became a public company via an initial public offering. He is on the board of directors of Intrepid Potash.

Awards and recognition
In 2017, Considine was elected to the Colorado Business Hall of Fame,

In 2020, he was elected to the Colorado Apartment Hall of Fame.

In 2019, Considine was awarded an honorary degree from Colorado Christian University.

He was given the Adam Smith Award in October 2019 by Economic Literacy Colorado.

Politics
In 1981, Considine moved to Colorado, where he entered politics through his father-in-law, Bo Callaway.

In 1986, Considine ran unsuccessfully for the Republican nomination to the United States Senate. His campaign adviser was Fox News executive Roger Ailes. The campaign was thrown into controversy after he called immigrants from Latin America "wetbacks". He then embarked on a $500,000 television advertising campaign.

From 1987 to 1991, he was a member of the Colorado Senate. Considine was appointed to fill the vacancy created when Senator Martha Ezzard resigned upon switching from the Republican Party to the Democratic Party. He took office March 4, 1987 and served in the 56th, 57th, and 58th General Assemblies. Considine edged out conservative Representative Phil Pankey for the appointment. In January 1991, Tom Blickensderfer was appointed to succeed Considine. He was the primary organizer of an initiative that led to Colorado being the first state to impose term limits on the governor and state legislature. He left the state Senate early in 1992 to pursue the open seat in the United States Senate created by the decision of Democrat Tim Wirth to forgo a bid for a second term. Considine was defeated in the 1992 general election by Democratic Congressman Ben Nighthorse Campbell.

He is a co-founder and member of the board of directors of Club for Growth, a conservative organization. He is also a member of the board of directors of the Bradley Foundation

Personal life
Considine is married to Betsy Callaway Considine. The couple are actively involved in education reform and ranching in western Colorado. They have three adult children and three grandchildren.

Philanthropy
Considine and his wife Betsy Callaway Considine provide charitable support, primarily to education and faith-based causes, including Compositive Primary, a workplace primary school on the Anschutz Medical Campus in Aurora, Colorado.

Considine and his wife have established the Considine Family Foundation. In 2017, it endowed a Harvard Law School professorship in honor of Antonin Scalia.

References

External links
 

1947 births
American chief executives of financial services companies
American real estate businesspeople
Republican Party Colorado state senators
Date of birth missing (living people)
Harvard Law School alumni
Living people
20th-century American politicians